Microphthalmini is a tribe of flies in the family Tachinidae.

Genera
Dexiosoma Rondani, 1856

References

Brachyceran flies of Europe
Brachycera tribes
Tachininae